Azarbeyglu (also Romanized as Āz̄arbeyglū) is a village in Khafri Rural District, in the Central District of Sepidan County, Fars Province, Iran. At the 2006 census, its population was 35, in 11 families.

References 

Populated places in Sepidan County